James Duckworth is the defending champion, but chose not to participate.

John Millman won the tournament, defeating Yasutaka Uchiyama in the final, 6–3, 3–6, 6–4.

Seeds

Draw

Finals

Top half

Bottom half

Resources 
 Main Draw
 Qualifying draw

2015 MS
2015 ATP Challenger Tour